Clement Tommy (born 27 June 1997) is a Vanuatuan cricketer. He played in the 2016 ICC World Cricket League Division Five tournament. In August 2018, he was named in Vanuatu's squad for Group A of the 2018–19 ICC World Twenty20 East Asia-Pacific Qualifier tournament. In March 2019, he was named in the Vanuatuan squad for the Regional Finals of the 2018–19 ICC World Twenty20 East Asia-Pacific Qualifier tournament. He made his Twenty20 International (T20I) debut for Vanuatu against the Philippines on 24 March 2019.

In June 2019, he was selected to represent the Vanuatu cricket team in the men's tournament at the 2019 Pacific Games. In September 2019, he was named in Vanuatu's squad for the 2019 Malaysia Cricket World Cup Challenge League A tournament. He made his List A debut for Vanuatu, against Canada, in the Cricket World Cup Challenge League A tournament on 17 September 2019.

References

External links
 

1997 births
Living people
Vanuatuan cricketers
Vanuatu Twenty20 International cricketers
Place of birth missing (living people)